Jose Guerra is a Canadian former soccer player who had stints in the USISL Pro League, and the Canadian Professional Soccer League.

Playing career 
Guerra began his professional career in 1996 in the USISL Pro League with Houston Hurricanes. With Houston he would finish with seven goals, but the club finished last in the Central Division eliminating the team from playoff contention. In 2001, he signed with newly expansion franchise the Montreal Dynamites of the Canadian Professional Soccer League. He helped Montreal finish fourth in the overall standings, thus qualifying for the playoffs. In the playoffs, the Dynamites faced St. Catharines Wolves, but were defeated by a score of 2-1.

References 

Canadian soccer players
Canadian Soccer League (1998–present) players
Laval Dynamites players
Soccer people from Quebec
USL Second Division players
Living people
Association football midfielders
Year of birth missing (living people)